Jumping Creek is a  long 1st order tributary to the Trent River in Jones County, North Carolina.

Course
Jumping Creek rises about 5 miles northeast of Trenton, North Carolina and then flows south to join the Trent River about 2.5 miles north of Olivers Crossroads.

Watershed
Jumping Creek drains  of area, receives about 54.8 in/year of precipitation, has a wetness index of 587.25, and is about 24% forested.

See also
List of rivers of North Carolina

References

Rivers of North Carolina
Rivers of Jones County, North Carolina